David Lyons (born 16 April 1976) is an Australian actor. He is known for his roles as Josh Holiday in the Nine Network navy drama Sea Patrol (2007-2009), Dr. Simon Brenner in the NBC medical drama ER (2008-2009) and as General Sebastian Monroe in the NBC post-apocalyptic drama Revolution (2012-2014).

Early life and education
Lyons was born in Melbourne, Victoria, Australia. He graduated from Yarra Valley Grammar school in 1993 and continued on to graduate from Australia's National Institute of Dramatic Art (NIDA) with a degree in Performing Arts (Acting) in 2004.

Career
In 2005, Lyons had a recurring role on the Seven Network police drama Blue Heelers and guest-starred on the Seven Network/Network Ten/Eleven soap opera Neighbours.

Lyons starred in the Nine Network police drama Sea Patrol, where he played the Leading Seaman Josh Holiday for the show's first three series from 2007 until 2009.

Lyons began starring in the NBC medical drama ER as Dr. Simon Brenner, making his first appearance in season 14, episode 14 titled "Owner of a Broken Heart" which aired on 10 April 2008, but he was credited as a special guest star. When the show's 15th and final season premiere titled "Life After Death" aired on 25 September 2008, Lyons was added to the main cast. Lyons remained on the show until it ended with the two-hour series finale, "And in the End...", which aired 2 April 2009.

In 2009, Lyons starred in the TV movie A Model Daughter: The Killing of Caroline Byrne.

In 2010, Lyons appeared in the biographical romantic drama Eat Pray Love, which starred Julia Roberts and was based on Elizabeth Gilbert's autobiography of the same name.

In January 2011, Lyons starred as the title role in the NBC superhero drama The Cape until the show was cancelled in March that same year after ten episodes.

Lyons co-starred with Billy Burke in the NBC post-apocalyptic drama Revolution, which ran for two seasons from 17 September 2012 to 21 May 2014. He played Sebastian "Bas" Monroe, a former US Marine Corps sergeant who served with Miles Matheson (Burke), founded the Monroe Republic, and became its President and later General of its Militia.

In 2013, Lyons co-starred with Josh Duhamel and Julianne Hough in the romantic drama Safe Haven, based on Nicholas Sparks' novel of the same name.

Filmography

Awards and nominations

References

External links 

 

1976 births
21st-century Australian male actors
Australian male film actors
Australian male television actors
Living people
National Institute of Dramatic Art alumni
Male actors from Melbourne
People educated at Trinity College (University of Melbourne)